Borivoje Đorđević (born 2 August 1948) is a Serbian former footballer.

Club career
While playing in Partizan, he was known for his excellent assists and as an extraordinary playmaker. For a full decade there, he played a total of 322 matches and scored 50 goals. Afterwards, he decided to play the rest of his career abroad. First, he played for Panathinaikos from 1975 to 1978 winning the Greek championship, the Greek cup in 1977 and the Balkan cup, and then, he opted to play in German club SV Eintracht Trier 05 where he finished his playing career in 1980.

International career
He played for the national team in all its youth levels and, in all but the seniors, archived to be the team captain. He played for the Yugoslavia national team nine matches, and his highest moment was the participation at UEFA Euro 1968. His debut was on 12 November 1967 in Belgrade against Albania (a 4–0 win) and his last match was on 21 April 1971, in Novi Sad, in a friendly against Romania (0–1 loss).

Honours
Partizan
European Champions Cup finalist: 1966

Yugoslavia
UEFA European Championship: 1968

Panathinaikos
 Greek Championship champion: 1976–77
 Greek Cup winner: 1977
 Balkan Cup winner: 1977

References

External links
 
 
 
 Serbian national football team website 

1948 births
Living people
Footballers from Belgrade
SV Eintracht Trier 05 players
Expatriate footballers in West Germany
Expatriate footballers in Germany
Expatriate footballers in Greece
FK Partizan players
Panathinaikos F.C. players
Super League Greece players
Yugoslav footballers
Yugoslavia international footballers
Serbian footballers
Serbian expatriate footballers
Yugoslav expatriate footballers
UEFA Euro 1968 players
Yugoslav expatriate sportspeople in Germany
Yugoslav expatriate sportspeople in Greece
Association football midfielders
Yugoslav First League players
2. Bundesliga players